"La, la, la" is a song recorded by Spanish singer Massiel, written by Manuel de la Calva and Ramón Arcusa. It is best known as the Spanish winning entry at the Eurovision Song Contest 1968 in London. It was the first time that Spain won the Contest.  Massiel also released the song in English as "He Gives Me Love (La, La, La)".

Eurovision
The performance of the song was the first of Spain's two Eurovision wins to date. The song was composed by Ramón Arcusa and Manuel de la Calva, otherwise known as the singing duo Dúo Dinámico. This was the first Eurovision Song Contest broadcast in colour, with viewers noting Massiel's backing singers in their short teal coloured dresses (from left/tallest to right/shortest, they were María Jesús Aguirre, María Dolores Arenas, and Mercedes Valimaña Macaria).

"La, la, la" beat the favourite, the 's "Congratulations", by just one point. Bill Martin (writer of the UK entry) called the Spanish song "a piece of rubbish".

Joan Manuel Serrat, the artist originally chosen to perform Spain's entry, intended to sing it in Catalan. The Francoist State dictatorship would not allow this – and insisted that the entry should be performed in Spanish (which is in fact the language of Castile), official language for all the territories of Spain, although Serrat wanted to make a claim for the other regional languages of this country, repressed under the Francoist State. Hence the last-minute substitution of Massiel as singer. It was not until , when Andorra made its first entry, that Catalan would be heard on the contest stage.

A documentary film shown on Spanish television in 2008 claimed that Caudillo Franco had had the competition fixed to ensure a victory for Spain, which would boost the country's image abroad. Massiel was outraged by the allegations, insisting that she won because her song was better, and that Franco would have not been able to buy any votes for her in the first place. She also blamed the allegations on competition among Spanish TV channels. José María Íñigo, the person who had made the original claims in the documentary, later retracted them, saying "If there had been such a manipulation, it would have been for a different artist who had been closer to the regime."

Recordings
Massiel recorded the song in four languages; Spanish, Italian, German, all as "La, la, la", and in English, as "He Gives Me Love (La, la, la)". It was later covered by the Italian singer Mina in Radiotelevisione Italiana's 1968 variety series Canzonissima and by Finnish singer Carola. The band Saint Etienne recorded another cover version, featured on the album A Song for Eurotrash (1998) with English lyrics that differ from the original, referring to the man she is dating instead of the things she is thankful for. The biggest-selling recording of the song, however, was the cover-version, performed in Spanish, by Portuguese fado star Amália Rodrigues. It was also sung by Alpay, a famous Turkish singer, in Turkish that same year as "La La La Şarkı Sözü" and released as the B side of his single "Sen Gidince" in 1969. Heidi Brühl covered it in German and Marcela Laiferová in Slovak.

Charts

References

External links
 Official Eurovision Song Contest site, history by year, 1968
 Detailed info and lyrics, The Diggiloo Thrush, "La, la, la"
 History of the song, as narrated by the members of Dúo Dinámico (in Spanish)

Eurovision songs of Spain
Spanish-language songs
Eurovision songs of 1968
Eurovision Song Contest winning songs
1968 songs